The 1959 Boston College Eagles football team represented Boston College as an independent during the 1959 NCAA University Division football season. The Eagles were led by ninth-year head coach Mike Holovak and played their home games at Alumni Stadium in Chestnut Hill, Massachusetts. At the conclusion of a 5–4 season, Holovak was fired as head coach. He posted a record of 49–29–3 in his nine seasons at Boston College.

Schedule

References

Boston College
Boston College Eagles football seasons
Boston College Eagles football
1950s in Boston